The Rio Cocó is a river in the Brazilian state of Ceará.

Name 
The name "Cocó" comes from the plural of the Tupi word kó, an allusion to the agricultural practices of the indigenous people on the river.

Course 
The rivers starts on the eastern slope of  Serra da Aratanha, in Pacatuba and passes over the course of 50 kilometers through Maracanaú, Itaitinga and Fortaleza, before discharging into the Atlantic Ocean near Sabiaguaba beach.

Between Pacatuba and Itaitinga, the river includes the Gavião Dam.

Ecosystem 
The mouth of the river contains an important Mangrove ecosystem that has been partially restored as part of a mangrove restoration program. A 2021 paper found that even newly restored mangroves in the delta stored a significant amount of organic carbon as a blue carbon.

References

References 

Rivers of Ceará